Rider Bennett, LLP was a 47-year-old law firm based in Minneapolis, Minnesota that closed in May 2007. It was founded in 1960 by Stu Rider, Gene Bennett and Bill Egan, all three of whom had attended the University of Minnesota Law School together. They were later joined by Chet Johnson and Ed Arundel. The firm was known as Rider Bennett Egan Johnson and Arundel for a short time, but for most of its history was known as Rider Bennett Egan and Arundel.

It had 190 employees at the time of its closure, 90 of whom were attorneys. Former managing partner Gregory Weyandt attributed the firm's demise to the growth of national law firms in the legal market.

Rider Bennett had been a tenant at the office building 33 South Sixth since 2004.

References

Defunct law firms of the United States
Law firms based in Minneapolis
Law firms established in 1960
Law firms disestablished in 2007
Defunct companies based in Minnesota